The Live Tapes Vol. 2 is a live album by Australian rock band Cold Chisel. The album was recorded in Melbourne’s Bombay Rock on 27 April 1979 and released on 14 November 2014. The album peaked at number 19 in Australia.

This recording was broadcast live-to-air on AM radio stations around Australia and recorded just two months after the release of the band's revered second album Breakfast at Sweethearts. The Live Tapes Vol. 2 features all but one of that album's songs.

Reviews
Bill Johnston of News Corp gave the album 4 out of 5 saying; "The sound is of a road-hardened young band playing intensely which will remind older fans of the group’s formative years while providing an entry for newer fans beyond the radio staples."

Track listing

 Shipping Steel (3:21)
 Home and Broken Hearted (3:21)
 Dresden (4:25)
 Conversations (3:54)
 Showtime (3:39)
 The Door (4:59)
 Breakfast at Sweethearts (4:14)
 Plaza (3:50)
 One Long Day (9:15)
 Merry-Go-Round (3:54)
 Wild Thing (7:19)
 Goodbye (Astrid Goodbye) (3:54)

Charts

Release history

References

Universal Music Australia albums
Cold Chisel albums
2014 live albums
Live albums by Australian artists